Oxalis pennelliana is a species of plant in the family Oxalidaceae. It is endemic to Ecuador.

References

Flora of Ecuador
pennelliana
Endangered plants
Taxonomy articles created by Polbot